E a Vida Continua... is a 2012 Brazilian drama film directed by Paulo Figueiredo, based on the book of the same name by the medium Chico Xavier.

Plot
When the car of young Evelina (Amanda Costa) breaks on the road, she has no idea how her path will be deeply changed forever. Bailed out by Ernesto (Luiz Baccelli), Evelina soon discovers that they are going exactly to the same hotel.

Immediately they develop a friendship so solid that will persist when both leave to another dimension.

Cast
Lima Duarte
Amanda Acosta
Ana Lúcia Torre
Ana Rosa
Arlete Montenegro
Carla Fioroni
Cesar Pezzuolli
Claudia Mello
Luiz Baccelli
Luiz Carlos Felix

References

External links
  
 

Brazilian drama films
Films about Spiritism
2012 drama films
2012 films
2010s Portuguese-language films